Pustynka is a rural locality (a village) in Malyginskoye Rural Settlement, Kovrovsky District, Vladimir Oblast, Russia. The population was 6 as of 2010.

Geography 
Pustynka is located 22 km northeast of Kovrov (the district's administrative centre) by road. Panyukino is the nearest rural locality.

References 

Rural localities in Kovrovsky District